The Melbourne University Cricket Club, often called simply "University", plays the sport of cricket in the elite club competition of  Melbourne, Australia, known as Victorian Premier Cricket. The club was founded in 1856 and played its first season of premier cricket in 1906–07. Known as the Students, the club has won three first XI premierships. Its home ground is on the campus of the University of Melbourne in Parkville.

The club's famous players include: Roy Park, Bert Hartkopf, Ted a'Beckett, Keith Rigg, Colin McDonald, George Thoms, Bob Cowper, Paul Sheahan, Jim Higgs, Frank Tyson, Ian Botham and Shane Warne.

References

External links
 

Victorian Premier Cricket clubs
Cricket clubs in Melbourne
Cricket
University and college sports clubs in Australia
1856 establishments in Australia
Cricket clubs established in 1856
Cricket in Melbourne
Sport in the City of Melbourne (LGA)